Alexander "Sandy" Herd (24 April 1868 – 18 February 1944) was a Scottish professional golfer from St Andrews. He won The Open Championship in 1902 at Hoylake.

Early life
Born in St Andrews, Scotland, on 24 April 1868, to a golfing family, Herd had brothers who were also golf professionals.

Golf career
Herd was the club professional at Huddersfield Golf Club from 1892 to 1911. He won The Open Championship in 1902 at Hoylake. Herd had a three-shot lead after 54 holes, but nearly let the title slip out of his hands by scoring an 81 in the final round. Harry Vardon and James Braid both had medium length putts at the final hole to force a playoff, but they missed and Herd took the Championship.

Herd was the first Open Champion to use the Haskell rubber-cored ball. In 1920, he became the oldest runner-up in The Open at age 52, which stood for 89 years, until Tom Watson (age 59) in 2009. Herd's appearances in the championship spanned fifty years, the last at age 71 at St Andrews in 1939, but failed to advance from qualifying. He last played in The Open six years earlier in 1933, but twisted an ankle during the first round and had to withdraw; he last made the cut in 1927 and tied for tenth.

Herd's brother Fred won the U.S. Open in 1898.

Herd also got involved in golf course architect and worked with Alister MacKenzie to create Wakefield Golf Clubs 18-hole course.

Death
Following an operation, Herd died of pneumonia at age 75 in London in 1944.

Tournament wins
Note: This list may be incomplete
1895 Irish Championship Meeting Professional Tournament
1896 Irish Championship Meeting Professional Tournament
1901 Irish Championship Meeting Professional Tournament
1902 The Open Championship
1904 Leeds Cup
1905 Leeds Cup
1906 News of the World Match Play
1911 Sphere and Tatler Foursomes Tournament (with James Bradbeer)
1923 Roehampton Invitation
1925 Hertfordshire Open Championship
1926 News of the World Match Play

Major championships are shown in bold.

Major championships

Wins (1)

Results timeline

Note: Herd only played in The Open Championship

NT = No tournament
CUT = missed the half-way cut
WD = withdrew
"T" indicates a tie for a place

Team appearances
England–Scotland Professional Match (representing Scotland): 1903 (winners), 1904 (tie), 1905 (tie), 1906, 1907, 1909, 1910, 1912 (tie), 1913, 1932
Coronation Match (representing the Professionals): 1911 (winners)
Seniors vs Juniors (representing the Seniors): 1928 (winners)

References

Scottish male golfers
Winners of men's major golf championships
Golfers from St Andrews
Deaths from pneumonia in England
1868 births
1944 deaths